Ramiro Núñez de Guzmán (León, Spain, c. 1600 – Madrid, 1668) was a Spanish nobleman.

Biography
He served as viceroy of Naples 1637-44 under King Philip IV of Spain. He was the son-in-law of Gaspar de Guzmán, Count-Duke of Olivares.
He held various additional titles including Lord of the House Guzman, II Duke of Medina de las Torres, Prince of Stigliano, Duke of Sabbioneta, lord of the Valle de Curuenyo, lord of the Council of Cilleros, Sumiller de Corps, Chancellor of the Indies, General Treasurer of the Crown of Aragon, Commander of valdepeñas, Captain of the hundred continuous guard the royal person, Castilian of Castel Nuovo in Naples, Lieutenant and Captain General. 

His wife, Anna Carafa, duchess of Stigliano is known as the owner and namesake of Villa Donn'Anna, a major landmark in Posillipo.

References
 El Conde-Duque de Olivares. Elliott, John, 
 Mariana de Austria. Imagen, poder y diplomacia de una reina cortesana . Oliván, Laura, .
 "A Spanish Statesman of Appeasement: Medina de las Torres and Spanish Policy, 1639-1670", Historical Journal, 19 (1976), 1-31. Stradling, R. A.

1600s births
1668 deaths
People from León, Spain
Spanish viceroys